Greens Landing is a census-designated place in Athens Township, Bradford County, Pennsylvania, United States.  It is part of Northeastern Pennsylvania and is located along US Route 220 approximately five miles south of the borough of Athens. As of the 2010 census, the population of Greens Landing was 894 residents.

References

External links

Census-designated places in Pennsylvania
Census-designated places in Bradford County, Pennsylvania